White Oak Valley is an unincorporated community in Brown County, in the U.S. state of Ohio.

History
A post office called White Oak Valley was established in 1848, and remained in operation until 1860. The community was named for the valley of nearby White Oak Creek.

References

Unincorporated communities in Brown County, Ohio
1848 establishments in Ohio
Populated places established in 1848
Unincorporated communities in Ohio